The Graham Moss Medal was awarded to the best player on the ground for Western Australia in State Of Origin matches. It was only awarded from 1995 to 1998 and is named after Graham Moss.

Winners
1995 – Tony Evans
1996 – Derek Kickett
1997 – Scott Cummings
1998 – Peter Bell

References

Australian rules football in Western Australia
Australian Football League awards
Australian rules football State of Origin